Mateo Hasa (born 23 May 1993) is an Albanian football player, who most recently played as a striker for Burreli football club in Albania's First Division.

References

External links
 Profile - FSHF

1993 births
Living people
Footballers from Kavajë
Albanian footballers
Association football forwards
Albania youth international footballers
Besa Kavajë players
KS Albpetrol Patos players
KS Lushnja players
KS Shkumbini Peqin players
KS Egnatia Rrogozhinë players
KS Burreli players
Kategoria Superiore players
Kategoria e Parë players